Coccodontidae is a family of extinct pycnodontid fish that lived during the lower Cenomanian.  The various genera had massive, curved spines.

The family is composed of five genera, the type genus, Coccodus, Paracoccodus which was split off from Coccodus, the newly described Corusichthys, the sexually dimorphic Hensodon, and Trewavasia.  Ichthyoceros was, at one time, placed in Coccodontidae, but then was moved with Trewavasia in "Trewavasiidae," and then, in 2014, was placed in the related pycnodontid family Gladiopycnodontidae, while Trewavasia was returned to Coccodontidae.

Coccodontidae, together with Gladiopycnodontidae and the superficially shrimpfish-like Gebrayelichthyidae, make up the pycnodontid superfamily Coccodontoidea.

See also

 Prehistoric fish
 List of prehistoric bony fish

References

Pycnodontiformes
Late Cretaceous fish
Cretaceous bony fish
Prehistoric ray-finned fish families
Cenomanian first appearances
Cenomanian extinctions